Virola calophylla is a species of tree in the family Myristicaceae.  It is native to Central America and South America, namely Panama,
Guyana, Suriname, Brazil, Bolivia, Colombia (Department of Amazonas, Department of Vaupés), Ecuador (Napo, Pastaza, Sucumbios) and Peru (Amazonas Region, Loreto Region, Madre de Dios Region, Puno Region, Ucayali Region).

Virola calophylla contains dimethyltryptamine and other tryptamines, and in the Orinoco River region, the Witoto and Bora use it as a snuff.

See also
List of psychoactive plants

References

calophylla
Medicinal plants
Trees of Bolivia
Trees of Brazil
Trees of Colombia
Trees of Guyana
Trees of Panama
Trees of Suriname
Trees of Peru
Trees of Ecuador